New Ukraine may refer

 People's Democratic Union "New Ukraine", a political union of Ukraine established in 1992
 People's Party New Ukraine, former name of Peasant Bloc Agricultural Ukraine
 Green Ukraine, a historical name for an area in the Russian Far East